Prince Mpumelelo Dube (born 17 February 1997) is a Zimbabwean footballer who plays as a forward for Azam FC and the Zimbabwe national football team.

Career

Club
In August 2020, after several years spent playing in his native Zimbabwe, Dube joined Tanzanian club Azam, signing a three-year contract.

International
Dube made his senior international debut on 26 March 2017 in a 0-0 friendly draw with Zambia.

International Goals
Scores and results list Zimbabwe's goal tally first.

Career statistics

International

References

1997 births
Living people
Highlanders F.C. players
SuperSport United F.C. players
Black Leopards F.C. players
Zimbabwe Premier Soccer League players
South African Premier Division players
Zimbabwean footballers
Zimbabwe international footballers
Association football forwards
Zimbabwean expatriate footballers
Expatriate soccer players in South Africa
Zimbabwean expatriate sportspeople in South Africa
Expatriate footballers in Tanzania
Zimbabwean expatriate sportspeople in Tanzania
2021 Africa Cup of Nations players